David Brian Robertson (died October 7, 2020) was a political scientist. He was known for his research on American political development.

Robertson obtained PhD in political science from Indiana University, Bloomington in 1981. He was a political science professor at the University of Missouri-St. Louis until 2020 .

Robertson died from pancreatic cancer on October 7, 2020 at age 69.

References 

2020 deaths
American political scientists
Indiana University Bloomington alumni
University of Missouri–St. Louis faculty
Year of birth missing
Deaths from pancreatic cancer